Samuel Purviance is the name of:
 Samuel Anderson Purviance (1809–1882), U.S. Representative from Pennsylvania
 Samuel D. Purviance (1774–1806), U.S. Representative from North Carolina